Kiviküla may refer to several places in Estonia:

Kiviküla, Lääne County, village in Ridala Parish, Lääne County
Kiviküla, Lääne-Viru County, village in Viru-Nigula Parish, Lääne-Viru County
Kiviküla, Valga County, village in Õru Parish, Valga County